State Route 344 (SR 344) is an east-west state highway lying entirely in Columbiana County, Ohio.  Its western terminus is at State Route 14 and State Route 9  in downtown Salem, and its eastern terminus is along a concurrency with State Route 164 in downtown Columbiana.

History
SR 344 was originally established, in 1935, originally routed from SR 45, west of Leetonia, to Columbiana. Between 1979 and 1981, the route was extended to Salem along what was SR 558, SR 558 was also rerouted to the south along some of the former SR 344. In that same year, the highway was rerouted between former SR 558 and Leetonia along a previously unnumbered road.  No significant changes have taken place to this state route since 1981.

Major intersection

References

344
Transportation in Columbiana County, Ohio